Ray Martin may refer to:

Ray Martin (Australian footballer) (1909–1988), Australian rules footballer
Ray Martin (baseball) (1925–2013), American baseball player
Ray Martin (English footballer) (born 1945), English association football player
Ray Martin (orchestra leader) (1918–1988), British orchestra leader
Ray Martin (politician) (born 1941), Canadian politician and former leader of the Alberta New Democratic Party
Ray Martin (pool player) (born 1936), American pool player
Ray Martin (television presenter) (born 1944), Australian journalist/television presenter

See also
Raymond Martin (disambiguation)